Riston is a civil parish in the East Riding of Yorkshire, England.

The civil parish is formed by the village of Long Riston and the hamlet of Arnold.

According to the 2011 UK census, Riston parish had a population of 979, an increase on the 2001 UK census figure of 630.

References

External links

Civil parishes in the East Riding of Yorkshire